The Unknown Shore is a novel published in 1959 by Patrick O'Brian. It is the story of two friends, Jack Byron and Tobias Barrow, who sail aboard HMS Wager as part of the voyage around the world led by Anson in 1740. Their ship did not make it all the way around the world, unlike the flagship. The novel is a fictionalised version of actual events which occurred during the Wager Mutiny.

Some reviewers feel that the midshipman Byron and the somewhat unworldly surgeon's mate Barrow are prototypes for Jack Aubrey and Stephen Maturin, who appear in O'Brian's Aubrey–Maturin series set in the Napoleonic Wars.

Plot summary

In the early part of the novel, set in London, other members of the expedition are featured. They appear in more detail in The Golden Ocean, another O'Brian novel about the Anson expedition.

The expedition is beset by storms while rounding of Cape Horn, the Wager is shipwrecked off the coast of Chile as their position could not be determined. The crew rejected the authority of their officers, once the ship was wrecked and left the captain, some officers, and some other crew on the island when they sailed away in a boat built from the wreck.  The marooned officers make their way to a Spanish settlement with the help of the native people. The novel is based on the accounts of the survivors.  Survivors from the lower deck made their way back to Britain long before the officers.  The novel describes the crew members asserting that the officers had no authority over them, once their ship was wrecked.

Characters in The Unknown Shore
Jack Byron – protagonist
Tobias Barrow – "Jack's" friend

Allusions to real events, the shipwreck

The Wager's crew did reject the authority of their officers, once the ship was wrecked.
The lesson of the wreck of the Wager played a role in revising naval discipline, so that officers did retain formal authority over crew members, even when their ships were lost or captured.

Allusions to real persons
John "Jack" Byron was a historical person and the basic facts of the story are true. He went on to a distinguished naval career, rising to the rank of vice-admiral. There is an "easter egg" that O'Brian includes in the novel: his Jack Byron secretly writes poetry.  He wants Tobias to refrain from mentioning it to any of his peers. The famous poet Lord Byron was one of John Byron's grandsons.

See also

The Golden Ocean - another work by Patrick O'Brian, whose two protagonists are young men aboard one of the other vessels on the same expedition as the Wager.

References

1959 British novels
Historical novels
Novels by Patrick O'Brian
Fiction set in 1740
Rupert Hart-Davis books